"Soul Sista" is the debut single released in 2000 by American R&B/neo soul singer Bilal. The song was in support of his debut studio album, 1st Born Second released under Interscope Records. It also appeared on the soundtrack to Love & Basketball. The song was a top 20 R&B hit, peaking at No. 18 on the Billboard R&B Singles chart, as well as reaching No. 71 on the Hot 100.

Track listing
US 5" CD

Charts

Weekly charts

Year-end charts

References

2000 debut singles
Bilal (American singer) songs
Songs written by Mike City
Songs written by James Mtume
1999 songs
Interscope Records singles
Songs written by Bilal (American singer)
Song recordings produced by Raphael Saadiq